Stewart Littlefair (born 9 July 1946) is a British archer. He competed in the men's individual event at the 1976 Summer Olympics.

References

1946 births
Living people
British male archers
Olympic archers of Great Britain
Archers at the 1976 Summer Olympics
People from Edmonton, London
20th-century British people